RTD may refer to:

Science and technology
 Real-time data
 Residence time distribution
 Resonant-tunneling diode
 Round-trip delay time, in telecommunications
 Research and development, Research and Technical (or Technological) Development
 Resistance Temperature Detector, a resistance thermometer; RTD is also used to rate or describe plywood manufacturing processes where RTD sensors significantly reduce the delamination caused by insufficient heating of the plywood during the press cycle.

Broadcasting
 Radio Tanzania Dar es Salaam
 Radio Television of Djibouti (Radiodiffusion Télévision de Djibouti)
 RT Documentary, an English- and Russian-language TV channel
 Russell T Davies, Welsh screenwriter and television producer

Publications
 RTD info, a European science magazine
 Richmond Times-Dispatch newspaper, Virginia, US

Transportation
 Regional Transportation District, Denver, Colorado, US
 San Joaquin Regional Transit District, Stockton, California, US
 Southern California Rapid Transit District, merged into Los Angeles County Metropolitan Transportation Authority

Other uses
 Ready to drink beverage
 Corner retirement (referee technical decision), in boxing
 Retired (abbreviation)
 Russell's theory of descriptions